Gurangan (also Romanized as Gūrāngān; also known as Gūrāngah) is a village in Melkari Rural District, Vazineh District, Sardasht County, West Azerbaijan Province, Iran. According to the 2006 census, its population was 135, in 25 families.

References 

Populated places in Sardasht County